Asian Ethnicity is a quarterly peer-reviewed academic journal covering research about ethnic groups and ethnic relations in Asia. It was established in 2000 and is published by Routledge. Currently, the journal is run by a team of editors-in-chief, led by Ian G. Baird, professor of geography, University of Wisconsin-Madison, Matthew W. King, associate professor of religious studies, University of California, Riverside, and Debojyoti Das, lecturer, University of Sussex, Falmer. This team of editors-in-chief started in February 2021.

Colin Mackerras, emeritus professor at Griffith University (Australia) is the founding editor-in-chief of Asian Ethnicity. Chih-yu Shih, a professor of political science at National Taiwan University is the second editor-in-chief of Asian Ethnicity. Julie Yu-Wen Chen is the third editor-in-chief of the journal. She is currently a professor of Chinese studies at the University of Helsinki in Finland and hosting professor of Asian studies at Palacky University Olomouc in the Czech Republic. In 2017, Asian Ethnicity began to be indexed in the Emerging Social Science Index (ESCI).

Abstracting and indexing 
Asian Ethnicity is abstracted and indexed in:
 Emerging Social Science Index (ESCI)
CSA Worldwide Political Science Abstracts
 EBSCOhost
 International Bibliography of the Social Sciences
 International Political Science Abstracts
 Emerging Sources Citation Index
 Scopus

External links
 
Colin Mackerras, Chih-Yu Shih, Julie Yu-Wen Chen (2021) Twenty-One Years of Asian Ethnicity: A Short Recollection. Asian Ethnicity 22(3):399-403.

References 

Routledge academic journals
English-language journals
Publications established in 2000
Asian studies journals
Quarterly journals
Taylor & Francis academic journals